The third season of the reality television series Black Ink Crew aired on VH1 from  January 26, 2015 until October 19, 2015. It chronicles the daily operations and staff drama at an African American-owned and operated tattoo shop in Harlem, New York.

Cast

Main
Ceaser Emanuel
Dutchess Lattimore
O'Shit Duncan
Puma Robinson
Sassy Bermudez
Sky Day

Recurring
Ted Ruks
Walt Miller
Quani Robinson
Kathie Arseno
Donna Lombardi

Episodes

References

2015 American television seasons
Black Ink Crew